Teramo may refer to:

Places:
 Teramo, a city in central Italy

Names:
 Teramo Piaggio, Italian painter of the late-Renaissance
 Jacobus de Teramo (1349-1417), medieval canon lawyer and bishop
 Zacara da Teramo (1350 to 1360 – 1416), medieval composer, singer and papal secretary

Sports:
 Teramo Basket, an Italian basketball club
 Teramo Calcio, an Italian football club

Other:
 Teramo, a sports car in Driver: Parallel Lines.